Dan Hellie (born May 23, 1975) is an American sports announcer for Fox Sports and the NFL Network. Hellie can also be seen on Dana White's UFC Tuesday Night Contender Series, Tennessee Titans preseason games and Facebook's streaming college football games. He was a sports anchor for WRC-TV, an NBC affiliate in Washington, D.C.

Early life
Hellie was born in Manila, Philippines, where his parents were stationed while in the Peace Corps. Hellie moved to Shoshone, Idaho until he was in fourth grade, then to Gaithersburg, Maryland. His mother was a middle school teacher for Montgomery County and his father worked at the Interior Department. He attended Magruder High School, where he played football, basketball and baseball. Hellie attended the University of Tennessee, where he was a member of the Phi Gamma Delta fraternity. He earned a bachelor's degree in broadcast journalism. In 2014, Hellie was awarded the University of Tennessee Alumni Promise Award.

Early career
Hellie began his career in Alexandria, Minnesota, as an editor, producer and reporter.  After nine months, he moved to Florence, South Carolina, as a sports reporter-anchor for WPDE. After two years, Hellie moved to Florida, first working in West Palm Beach at WPTV then, in 2003, as sports director at WFTV in Orlando. While at WFTV, Hellie where voted best sportscaster in Florida by the Associated Press and most popular sportscaster by the Orlando Sentinel. In 2005, he was named best sportscaster in Florida. Hellie received an Associated Press award for best feature story for a segment he did on bull riding in which he rode a bull for eight seconds.

In July 2006, Hellie moved to WRC-TV in Washington D.C. area where he served as an anchor-reporter.

In 2011, Hellie was awarded Emmys for Outstanding Sports Anchor and Outstanding Sports Daily or Weekly Programs. Hellie hosted the Redskins Coaches Show.

Current career
Hellie works for the NFL Network, where he co-anchors the flagship show NFL Total Access with Lindsay Rhodes  (2018). Hellie has contributed to several  segments nominated for Emmy awards nominations on NFL Total Access, including Emmys for Outstanding Studio Show-Daily and the Shorty Award for Best Social Integration with Live Television. 

Hellie is the play-by-play announcer for Tennessee Titans preseason games with fellow NFL Network analyst Charles Davis. He also calls NFL games for FOX. Hellie regularly calls CFB games for FOX as well.

On July 11, 2017, Hellie joined former UFC Lightweight Yves Edwards to launch Dana White's Tuesday Night Contender series which aired digitally on UFC Fight Pass. Hellie teamed with Snoop Dogg and UFC Hall of Fame Inductee Urijah Faber on the series. 

Hellie is the host of the UFC's official Weigh-In Show, which is done for most pay-per-view events. He is joined by Laura Sanko, Daniel Cormier and a special guest analyst.

Hellie calls West Coast Conference college basketball games in Southern California.

Personal life
Hellie resides in Manhattan Beach, California, with his wife and their two children. In 2008, Hellie presented the commencement speech at his alma mater, Magruder High School. Hellie was inducted into the Magruder Athletic Hall of Fame on October 26, 2012.

References

External links
 
 Awkward Moments on TV with Dan Hellie
 Mike Shanahan told Hellie prior to the 2015 season that Kirk Cousins would be a top 10 QB in the NFL

American television sports announcers
University of Tennessee alumni
Living people
National Football League announcers
Television anchors from Washington, D.C.
1975 births
American television sports anchors
People from Manila
College football announcers
People from Gaithersburg, Maryland
People from Manhattan Beach, California
Alliance of American Football announcers
College basketball announcers in the United States